Echmepteryx intermedia is a species of scaly-winged barklouse in the family Lepidopsocidae. It is found in the Caribbean Sea, Central America, and North America.

References

Trogiomorpha
Articles created by Qbugbot
Insects described in 1974